Amblyomma testudinarium is a hard-bodied tick of the genus Amblyomma. It is found in Indonesia, India, Japan, Thailand, Sri Lanka and Vietnam. Adults parasitize various larger mammals such as buffalo and cattle, whereas nymphs and larvae use mostly larger and medium mammals.

Records
In 2010, a 74-year-old Korean woman was attacked by the tick, which is the first human case of Amblyomma bite from Korea. More human bites were recorded from Japan as well. Apart from humans, it is a common ectoparasite of snakes. SFTS virus was detected from the tick larva. In 1993, Rickettsia sp. strain AT-1T was isolated from the ticks from Japan.

References 

Amblyomma
Animals described in 1844